Sporting Club Hazebrouckois is a French football club based in Hazebrouck, Nord-Pas-de-Calais. It was founded in 1907. The club currently plays in the Championnat de France Amateurs 2, the fifth tier of the French football league system.

Honours
Champions Championnat National : 1973

External links
Official site

Football clubs in France
Association football clubs established in 1907
1907 establishments in France
Sport in Nord (French department)
Football clubs in Hauts-de-France